Epigaea gaultherioides is a species of flowering plant in the Ericaceae family. It is native to Transcaucasia and Turkey.

Description 
 Epigaea gaultherioides  is an evergreen subshrub (height: 0.5 m). Leaves elliptical (long: 60-110 mm, wide: 30-55 mm), leathery, base cordate, apex acuminate, petiole pubescent (long: 5-15 mm). Inflorescence an axillary fascicles of 1-3 flowers. Flowers: campanulate calyx (long: 12-15 mm), with 5 oval lobes, funneliform and pink corolla, with 5 lobes. Subglobose capsules (long: 1 mm).

References

External links
 
 

gaultherioides
Taxa named by Pierre Edmond Boissier
Taxa named by Benjamin Balansa
Taxa named by Armen Takhtajan
Flora of the Transcaucasus